The 1995 Chinese Jia-A League (known as Marlboro Jia-A League for sponsorship reasons) was the second season of  professional association football and the 34th top-tier overall league season held in China. Starting on April 16th 1995 and ending on November 19th 1995 the league saw Shanghai Shenhua win the championship.

Promotion and relegation

Teams promoted from 1994 Jia-B League
 Qingdao Hainiu 
 Tianjin

Relegated after end of 1994 Jia-A League
 Shenyang Liuyao
 Jiangsu Maint

Overview
It was contested by 12 teams, and Shanghai Shenhua won the championship.

League standings

Awards
Player of the year (Golden Ball Award)
Fan Zhiyi (Shanghai Shenhua)

Top scorer (Golden Boot Award)
Fan Zhiyi (Shanghai Shenhua)

Manager of the year
Xu Genbao (Shanghai Shenhua)

CFA Team of the Year

Goalkeeper: Ou Chuliang (Guangdong Hongyuan)

Defence: Wei Qun (Sichuan Quanxing), Xu Hong (Dalian Wanda), Fan Zhiyi (Shanghai Shenhua), Li Hongjun (Jilin Yanbian)

Midfield: Peng Weiguo (Guangzhou Apollo), Gao Hongbo (Beijing Guoan), Cao Xiandong (Beijing Guoan)

Attack: Hao Haidong (August 1), Li Bing (Guangdong Hongyuan), Gao Feng (Beijing Guoan),

See also
Chinese Jia-A League
Chinese Super League
Chinese Football Association Jia League
Chinese Football Association Yi League
Chinese FA Cup
Chinese Football Association
Football in China
List of football records in China
Chinese clubs in the AFC Champions League

References
China - List of final tables (RSSSF)

Chinese Jia-A League seasons
1
China
China
1995 establishments in China